Goripalayam is a 2010 Indian Tamil-language action drama film written and directed by Mayandi Kudumbathar fame Rasu Madhuravan. The film stars Vikranth, Harish, Ramakrishnan of Kunguma Poovum Konjum Puravum fame, Manivannan's son Raghuvannan, and Poongodi. The film released on 7 May 2010 to moderate responses.

Plot
Azhagar (Harish), the son of a police constable, is tempted to take bad habits, seeing his father in his younger days. Azhagar, along with his friends A to Z (Ramakrishnan), Azhagappa (Raghuvannan), Sangu Ganesan (K. P. Jagannath) and Inippu Murugan (Prakash), leads a carefree life by involving in petty crimes. Unfortunately, they hold responsibility in Viruman's (Ravi Mariya) sister's death. In a bid to take revenge on them, Viruman hires a contract killer named Paandi (Vikranth), who is in the business, only to educate his young brother. What happens after this forms the climax.

Cast 

 Vikranth as Paandi
 Harish as Azhagar
 Ramakrishnan as A to Z
 Raghuvannan as Azhagappan
 Prakash as Inippu Murugan
 Poongodi as Poomayilu
 Swasika as Parvathy
 Jagarthi Agarwal as Vijayalakshmi
 Ravi Mariya as Viruman
 Nandha Periyasamy as Karutha Pandi
 Singampuli as M. G. R. Chinnasamy
 Ilavarasu as Moovendhan
 K. P. Jagannath as Sangu Ganesan
 Rajkapoor
 Manobala
 Mayilsamy as Retired rowdy
 Alex as Kazhuvanadhan
 Sujibala as Rani
 Laksha
 Jayalakshmi

Soundtrack
Soundtrack was composed by Sabesh–Murali. Behindwoods wrote "Sabesh-Murali duo deserves a pat for sticking to sensible and gentle percussive usage for this ‘rural-themed’ story".

Reception
Sify wrote "Like all? made in Madurai? films, it is another gory tale that traces the story of four youngsters who have gone astray due to parental neglect at an early age. [..] Madurai films seems to be losing steam as the subject and treatment is the same in film after film since Sasikumar?s pathbreaking Subramaniapuram happened in 2008". Behindwoods wrote "Goripalayam could have been a sensible and sensitive film about how societal negligence can be a breeding opportunity for the unwanted".

References

External links
 
 Goripalayam at Oneindia.in

2010 films
Films shot in Madurai
Indian action drama films
2010 action drama films
2010s Tamil-language films
Films directed by Rasu Madhuravan